Vodochody Airport , also known as Aero Airport, is a private general aviation airport located in Vodochody in the Czech Republic. It is also the home to Aero Vodochody, a Czech aerospace company. The airport at an elevation of 919 ft/280m above sea level has an asphalt main runway 2500m long and an emergency strip 1400m long. LKVO is located 15 km North-West from the Capital of Prague.

Services provided
 Operating hours: Hx / H24. This is non-specific, adaptable 24/7 by demand.
 Handling, Transport, Catering services.
 Accommodations at Clarion Congress Hotel in Prague.
 Passengers to be transferred directly from the plane to the car and vice versa.
 Passenger lounge and crew rest area at the apron.
 JET A1, Avgas 100 LL available.

Details
 IFR/VFR Day&Night traffic allowed. Aerodrome Operating Minima: DH 300 ft, VIS 1000 m.
 Icao 3C aircraft category / Firefighting category 3 – Cat. 6 or higher ON REQUEST.
 Runway: 10/28 tora=2500m, toda=2560m, lda=2500m, asda=2500m.
 Tower, Approach, Radar services, Meteorology, Aro.
 The SID is not designed, expect a radar vectoring for departure.
 Training and test flights can be provided in reserved airspace up to FL660.
 Paintshop is available in the Aero factory.

References

External links

 Airport official site
 Airport plan
 Instrument Approach Chart
 Standard Arrival Chart

Airports in the Czech Republic
Prague-East District
Buildings and structures in Prague-East District
Airports established in 1942
1942 establishments in Czechoslovakia
20th-century architecture in the Czech Republic